Drosophila orthophallata is a species of fly in the subgenus Dudaica.

References 

orthophallata
Insects described in 2018